The Dothideaceae are a family of fungi in the order Dothideales. Species in this family have a widespread distribution, especially in tropical areas.

Genera
As accepted by Species Fungorum;

Bagnisiella - 31 spp. (placement uncertain) 

Dictyodothis - 8 spp.
Dothidea - 28 spp.
Hyalocrea - 2 spp. (may not be in family )
Omphalospora - 4 spp.
Pachysacca - 3 spp.
Phyllachorella - 2 spp. (placement uncertain)
Scirrhia - 23 spp.
Stylodothis - 3spp.
Vestergrenia - 24 spp.

References

Dothideales
Dothideomycetes families
Taxa named by François Fulgis Chevallier
Taxa described in 1826